The Nguruvilu (from Mapudungun ngürü, "fox" and filu, "snake"; also known as: Guirivilo, Guruvilu, Ñuruvilu, Ñirivilu, Ñivivilu, Ñirivilo and Nirivilo) is a creature originating from the Mapuche religion of the indigenous people inhabiting Chile. It is a river-dwelling creature that looks like a fox, with a long body, similar to a snake, and a long tail with fingernails that it uses like a claw.

Legend
The nguruvilu originates from the ethnic religion of the Mapuche. It is a river-dwelling creature and looks much like a strange fox, with a long body, similar to a snake, and a long tail with fingernails that it uses like a claw; but it is a water-being. Nguruvilus live in and are the cause of dangerous whirlpools which kill people who try to cross rivers. The creatures make the water shallow on either ford, to encourage people to try to cross it making it seem safe. However, the only safe way of crossing a river with a nguruvilu is by boat. The only way to get rid of a nguruvilu is through the offices of a machi (shaman) or good kalku "sorcerer". The kalku is to be offered gifts in return for the service of Nguruvilu removal. The kalku (who may be male or female) wades through the river until he or she reaches the whirlpool and then dives in. Afterwards, she swims to the surface having captured the Nguruvilu in her arms with her powerful magical abilities. She then proceeds to threaten the creature with a long, sharp knife, saying she will mutilate it if it ever harms another person trying to cross the waterway. The Kalku then releases the nguruvilu back into the water.

It is important that this act is witnessed by everyone from the area. Then usually a great celebration is held and no one must fear crossing the waterway ever again. The whirlpool or whirlpools shrink and then disappear, and the fords become even shallower, making the crossing safe enough even for the frailest old woman or youngest child. It is believed the creature moves its business elsewhere, probably to torment the peoples downstream at the next popular river crossing.

See also

Coi Coi-Vilu
Underwater panther
Ahuitzotl

References

Indigenous South American legendary creatures
Mapuche legendary creatures
Mythological aquatic creatures
Mythological monsters